Ressano Garcia is a small town in the Maputo Province, Mozambique. The town is adjacent to Komatipoort in South Africa. The town has around 11,200 people living in it.

Transport 

Both road and rail cross the border here from Mozambique into South Africa, and visa-versa.

This town has a railway station for the loading and offloading of passengers and cargo on the Pretoria–Maputo railway.

Adjacent stations 

 Muxia, Mozambique

Industry 
A gas-fired power station has begun operating in 2014. The power plant is co-owned by EDM and Sasol. It receives gas by pipeline from the Pana gas fields in Eastern Mozambique. The first plant has a generating capacity of 175 MW.

See also 

 Transport in Mozambique

References 

Mozambique–South Africa border crossings